This is a list of fiction works that have been made into feature films. The title of the work and the year it was published are both followed by the work's author, the title of the film, and the year of the film. If a film has an alternate title based on geographical distribution, the title listed will be that of the widest distribution area.

Books

0–9 & A–C

D–J

K–R

S–Z

Short stories and novellas

Children's literature

Comics

Plays

See also 
 Lists of film source material
 List of non-fiction works made into feature films

Notes 

Literature lists
Lists of novels
Lists of works adapted into films